Edward Arthur Gray (February 28, 1925 – April 10, 2007) was an American politician from New York. A member of the Democratic Party, Gray was elected to the New York State Senate in 1988, defeating Republican incumbent Dick Schermerhorn. He served one term before losing reelection to Bill Larkin. Gray previously held office as the longest-serving mayor of his home town of Port Jervis, New York. The town's post office building, which is listed on the National Register of Historic Places was named after him in 2008.

References

1925 births
2007 deaths
People from Port Jervis, New York
Democratic Party New York (state) state senators
20th-century American politicians